John Dixon Comrie (28 February 1875 – 2 October 1939) was a Scottish physician, historian of medicine, and the editor of the first edition of Black's Medical Dictionary.

Biography

Comrie studied at George Watson's College and the University of Edinburgh, graduating with M.B. degree and first-class honours in 1899. He became a Fellow of the Royal College of Physicians in 1906 and took a M.D. degree from Edinburgh in 1911, before positions in the Edinburgh and Glasgow Infirmaries. After that he did post-graduate studies in Berlin and Vienna, worked as clinical assistant at the National Hospital in London, and finally settled at Edinburgh, where he became known as pathologist, physician to the Royal Infirmary, and consulting physician to the Deaconess Hospital and the Princess Margaret Rose Hospital for Crippled Children. During World War I he acted as consulting physician to the North Russian Expeditionary Force, reaching the rank of Lieutenant-Colonel.

His father was also John Dixon Comrie (died before October 1939).

In 1932 he was elected a member of the Aesculapian club. In 1933, Comrie authored Diet in Health and Sickness which was positively reviewed in the British Medical Journal as a reliable guide to dietetics for practitioners.

Selected publications

Black's Medical Dictionary (1906 and later editions)
History of Scottish Medicine to 1860 (London, Baillière, Tindall & Cox, 1927)
Diet in Health and Sickness (1933)

References

External links

John Comrie papers at The National Archives

1875 births
1939 deaths
20th-century Scottish medical doctors
Alumni of the University of Edinburgh
Dietitians
Fellows of the Royal College of Physicians
People educated at George Watson's College
Scottish medical historians
Royal Army Medical Corps officers
British Army personnel of the Russian Civil War
British Army personnel of World War I